Victoria Jane Martin is a Scottish physicist who is Professor of Collider Physics at the University of Edinburgh. She works on the ATLAS experiment on the Higgs boson.

Early life and education 
Martin studied mathematical physics at the University of Edinburgh, graduating with a Bachelor of Science degree in 1996. She remained there for her postgraduate studies, working on CP violation on the NA48 experiment. She completed her PhD thesis A measurement of the CP violation parameter Re(e'/e) in 2000. During her PhD she visited CERN, where she enjoyed the diverse disciplines of people she worked with. She was a student of Peter Higgs.

Research and career 
Martin spent five years as a postdoctoral researcher at Northwestern University. She returned to Edinburgh in 2005, where she was appointed a lecturer. She is a member of the Royal Society of Edinburgh Young Academy.

Martin works on the ATLAS experiment and Compact Linear Collider. She has received significant funding from the Science and Technology Facilities Council to support upgrades to the particle collider. She is searching for the Higgs boson production, in association with top quarks. She looks for how it couples to the fermions of the Standard Model. She gave the 2013 MacMillan Lecture at the Institution of Engineers and Shipbuilders in Scotland. She took a sabbatical at CERN in 2015. During this time, she delivered the Royal Institution lecture Big Bucks for Big Bosons: Should we still be paying for the Large Hadron Collider?. In 2017 she took part in a British Council tour of India, talking about the Higgs boson. Martin is the Chair of the Science and Technology Facilities Council (STFC) peer review panel and the theme leader for the Scottish Universities' Physics Alliance. She is also involved in the teaching and administration of several courses at The University of Edinburgh

Martin is on the Board of Trustees of the Royal Society of Edinburgh and the advisory board of Perspective Realism. She took part in the Edinburgh Festival Fringe. She has taken part in several interviews with the BBC.

References

Living people
Year of birth missing (living people)
Place of birth missing (living people)
Alumni of the University of Edinburgh
Academics of the University of Edinburgh
Northwestern University staff
Nationality missing
People associated with CERN
Particle physicists
British women physicists
British physicists